Jasper-Hinton Airport  is located  southwest of Hinton, Alberta, Canada. The airport has three affiliated air charter operators conducting scenic tours of nearby Jasper National Park, Mount Robson and the Columbia Icefields as well as providing aerial services for mining, forestry and wildlife research.

Jasper-Hinton was among the first airports in Canada to test the ill-fated microwave landing system (MLS). It is now served only by an area navigation (RNAV) approach.

See also
Hinton/Entrance Airport
Jasper Airport

References

External links

Place to Fly on COPA's Places to Fly airport directory

Hinton, Alberta
Registered aerodromes in Alberta
Yellowhead County